Jennifer Anne Kupcho (born May 14, 1997) is an American professional golfer.

Amateur career
As a junior at Wake Forest University, she was named the winner of the Honda Sports Award for golf. As a senior, Kupcho won the inaugural Augusta National Women's Amateur in 2019. She also won the 2018 NCAA Division I Golf Championship. Kupcho was the number one ranked women's amateur golfer in the world for a total of 34 weeks, rising to the top on three occasions, the first time on July 11, 2018.

Professional career
Kupcho turned professional prior to the start of the 2019 U.S. Women's Open. She had earned her LPGA Tour card through the LPGA Qualifying Tournament in November 2018 but deferred playing until she finished her college career.

She set a 54-hole record in the 2022 Chevron Championship tournament in having a 16-under-par total (200) with her eight-under-par 64 in the third round. She beat the previous total by two strokes. She won the tournament by two strokes over Jessica Korda.

Amateur wins
2014 Colorado Junior Stroke Play Championship
2015 CWGA Stroke Play Championship
2016 CWGA Match Play Championship, CWGA Stroke Play Championship, Ruth's Chris Tar Heel Invite, The Landfall Tradition
2017 NCAA Athens Regional, CWGA Stroke Play Championship, Canadian Women's Amateur, Ocean Course Invitational
2018 Bryan National Collegiate, NCAA Tallahassee Regional, NCAA Division I Women's Golf Championship (individual)
2019 Tar Heel Classic Casa de Campo, Bryan National Collegiate, Augusta National Women's Amateur

Source

Professional wins (4)

LPGA Tour wins (3)

LPGA Tour playoff record (1–0)

Other wins (1)
2020 Colorado Women's Open

Results in LPGA majors

Wins (1)

Results timeline
Results not in chronological order before 2019 or in 2020.

CUT = missed the half-way cut
NT = no tournament
T = tied

LPGA Tour career summary

^ Official as of July 16, 2022  
*Includes matchplay and other tournaments without a cut.

World ranking
Position in Women's World Golf Rankings at the end of each calendar year.

U.S. national team appearances
Amateur
Arnold Palmer Cup: 2018 (winners)
Curtis Cup: 2018 (winners)
Espirito Santo Trophy: 2018 (winners)

Source

Professional
Solheim Cup: 2021

Solheim Cup record

References

External links

American female golfers
Wake Forest Demon Deacons women's golfers
LPGA Tour golfers
Winners of LPGA major golf championships
Golfers from Colorado
Sportspeople from Littleton, Colorado
1997 births
Living people
21st-century American women
20th-century American women